Sunshine, Joy, & Happiness: A Tragic Tale of Death, Despair, and Other Silly Nonsense (sometimes shortened to just Sunshine, Joy, & Happiness) is the fourth studio album by American indie rock group Get Set Go, released on January 22, 2008 through TSR Records. The album is the last by the group to feature guitarist Jim Daley, as well as the group's last recording released through TSR. After the release of this album, the group would continue to release music digitally through their own independently operated Square Tires Music label.

The CD edition of the album includes a DVD that contains a 25-minute compilation of tour footage and interviews of the band members explaining the tracks of the album.

Track listing

Personnel
Adapted from the Sunshine, Joy, & Happiness liner notes.

Michael "Mike TV" Torres – guitar, vocals, production
Jim Daley – guitar
Colin Schlitte – bass
Eric Summer – viola
Mike Summer – fiddle
Dave Palamaro – drums, video editing
Ryan "Schmed" Mayen – keyboards, percussion
John Would – slide guitar, production, mixing, recording
David J. Hay Chapman – art direction, design

References

2008 albums
Get Set Go albums